Psorothamnus fremontii, the Fremont's dalea or Fremont's indigo bush (after John C. Frémont) is a perennial legume shrub.

Distribution
Psorothamnus fremontii is common to the Southwestern United States and northwest Mexico - in the states of California, Nevada, Utah, and Arizona, Sonora, and Baja California.

References

External links

Calflora Database: Psorothamnus fremontii (Fremont indigobush,  Fremont's dalea, Fremont's indigo bush)
Jepson Manual eFlora (TJM2) treatment of Psorothamnus fremontii
USDA Plants Profile for Psorothamnus fremontii
Psorothamnus fremontii profile - Lady Bird Johnson: "Wildflower Center".
U.C. Photos Gallery — Psorothamnus fremontii

fremontii
Flora of the Southwestern United States
Flora of the California desert regions
Flora of the Great Basin
Flora of the Sonoran Deserts
Flora of Baja California
Flora of Arizona
Flora of Nevada
Flora of Sonora
Flora of Utah
Natural history of the Mojave Desert
John C. Frémont
Taxa named by Asa Gray
Taxa named by John Torrey
Flora without expected TNC conservation status